IAO Chant From The Melting Paraiso Underground Freak Out is an album by Acid Mothers Temple & the Melting Paraiso U.F.O. released by Riot Season in 2012. The album contains one piece, divided into two approximately 20-minute-long parts, based on the Gong song Master Builder. This marks the second time Acid Mothers Temple have covered Master Builder, again retitled as OM Riff, having previously covered it on IAO Chant From The Cosmic Inferno.

The album was released on both CD and a red-splattered vinyl LP, which was limited to 500 copies. A black vinyl LP repressing on 300 copies was released in 2013.

Track listing

Personnel
 Tsuyama Atsushi - bass, cosmic joker
 Tabata Mitsuru - guitar, guitar synthesizer, maratab
 Higashi Hiroshi - synthesizer, dancin'king
 Shimura Koji - drums, latino cool
 Kawabata Makoto - guitar, yangqin, tambour, voice, tape, speed guru
 Cotton Casino - space whisper, beer & cigarette

Technical personnel
 Kawabata Makoto - production, engineering and mixing 
 Yoshida Tatsuya - digital mastering
 Andrew Smith - Artwork
 Miyawaki Shintaro - Band photography

References

Acid Mothers Temple albums
2012 albums